The field hockey tournament at the 1971 Pan American Games was the second edition of the field hockey event at the Pan American Games. It took place in Cali, Colombia from 1 to 12 August 1971.

The defending champions Argentina won their second title in a row by defeating Mexico 1–0 in the final. Canada took the bronze medal by defeating Chile 1–0.

Results

Round robin

Fourth place play-off

First to fourth place classification

Semi-finals

Bronze medal match

Gold medal match

Final standings

References
 Pan American Games field hockey medalists on HickokSports

1971
1971 Pan American Games
Pan American Games
1971 Pan American Games